Jann Hoffmann (19 July 1957 – 16 January 2023) was a Danish professional darts player who competed in the Professional Darts Corporation events.

Career
Hoffmann played at the BDO World Darts Championship four times. In 1990, he caused a major shock, beating former world champion Bob Anderson in the first round. He eventually lost to Cliff Lazarenko in the second round. He repeated this performance in 1993, beating Bernd Hebecker in the first round but lost to 1992 runner-up Mike Gregory. He also played in the Winmau World Masters twice, in 1990 and 1992, losing in the first round on both occasions. Hoffmann also made the final of the 1991 Dutch Open, the 1993 Swedish Open and the Finnish Open final three times.

After the 1994 Danish Open, Hoffmann stopped playing and seemingly retired from the sport. However in 2006, Hoffmann returned to the oche at the Players Championship in the Netherlands, operated by the Professional Darts Corporation. Hoffmann also signed up to the PDPA.

Hoffmann represented Denmark with Per Laursen in the 2012 PDC World Cup of Darts and together they were beaten 3–1 by Northern Ireland in the second round, having defeated Gibraltar in round 1. He partnered Laursen once again in the 2013 World Cup of Darts and despite beating South Africa 5–4 in their first match, they finished bottom of Group B on leg difference following a 5–0 loss to the Republic of Ireland.

World Championship Results

BDO

 1990: 2nd Round (lost to Cliff Lazarenko 0–3) (sets) 
 1992: 1st Round (lost to Eric Bristow 0–3)
 1993: 2nd Round (lost to Mike Gregory 1–3)
 1994: 1st Round (lost to Colin Monk 0–3)

References

External links
 Profile at Darts Database

1957 births
2023 deaths
British Darts Organisation players
Danish darts players
Professional Darts Corporation associate players
PDC World Cup of Darts Danish team
People from Vejle Municipality
Sportspeople from the Region of Southern Denmark